The California High-Speed Rail system will be built in two phases. In Phase 2, the route will be extended in the Central Valley north to Sacramento, and from east through the Inland Empire and then south to San Diego. Phase 2 currently has no timeline for completion.

Background

On August 13, 2008, California Assembly Bill 3034 (AB 3034) was approved by the state legislature and signed by Governor Arnold Schwarzenegger on August 26, 2008. The bill was submitted to California voters in the November 2008 election as Proposition 1A and approved. With the voter's mandate, certain route and travel time requirements were established. Among these were that the route must link downtown San Francisco with Los Angeles and Anaheim, and must link the state's major population centers together, "including Sacramento, the San Francisco Bay Area, the Central Valley, [the] Los Angeles Basin, the Inland Empire, Orange County, and San Diego." The first phase of the project must link San Francisco with Los Angeles and Anaheim. Up to 24 stations were authorized for the completed system.

Some people were concerned with the Central Valley route going down the east side of the  Valley rather than the more open west side. Citizens for California High-Speed Rail Accountability note: "Environmental lawsuits against the California High-Speed Rail Authority often claim inadequate consideration of running the track next to Interstate 5 in the Central Valley or next to Interstate 580 over the Altamont Pass." However, the intent of Proposition 1A was clear in connecting the major population centers together as the current route does.

The Authority knew from the outset that it did not have enough funding to do the entire system, so it investigated ways to implement the system in stages. There were two basic options for the Initial Operating Section (IOS): extend the San Joaquin Valley segment, where construction had started, northward toward the San Francisco Bay Area (the IOS-North option, San Francisco to Bakersfield), or southward to Southern California (the IOS-South option, Merced to San Fernando Valley). In the 2012 and 2014 Business Plans the goal was to implement the IOS-South, but a 2016 analysis of the funding available and time necessary to completion lead the Authority to propose the IOS-North be implemented instead. The proposal, named the Silicon Valley to Central Valley Line, was expected to have sufficient funding available to bring this segment online by 2031. The rail authority stated its commitment to pursue additional funding to complete the Phase 1 system by 2033. The current 2022 Business Plan does not commit to the 2033 date.

California State Rail Modernization

The California Department of Transportation's State Rail Modernization Plan (2022) integrates the High-Speed Rail system into its long-range passenger rail plan. 

The map to the right shows how the HSR system will provide connections to long distance (Amtrak) as well as commuter rail services at the north and south ends of the HSR system.

The Interim Initial Operating Segment runs in the Central Valley from Merced (north end) to Bakersfield (south end).

Current implementation plan

The 2022 Business Plan focuses on developing an Interim Initial Operating Segment (IOS) between Merced and Bakersfield. This IOS will have 5 stations: Merced, Madera, Fresno, Kings/Tulare, and Bakersfield.

The route to San Francisco from the Central Valley has been selected, however funding to initiate construction from Merced to San Jose is not yet available.

Latest news
Route finalized from Central Valley to San Francisco

Although the Authority is focused on getting the Interim IOS in the Central Valley in operation by the end of the decade, it is also looking ahead to the next step (that is, connecting to San Francisco using the prepared Caltrain blended route). On April 28, 2022 it approved the final route in the San Jose to Merced section. This alignment (Alternative 4) uses the existing Union Pacific Railroad (UPRR) alignment from San Jose to Gilroy as a blended section.

Trains will be able to travel at  even through the tunnels. When tunnel field studies, early engineering, and design work are completed for this section, it will be ready for construction when funding is available. Tunnel construction is anticipated to take up to 6 years to complete once begun.

Phase 1 route details

Note: Initial Operating Segment sections are indicated by "(IOS)" in the subsection headings below:

San Francisco to San Jose
The  bookend from San Francisco to San Jose used by Caltrain is scheduled to be electrified by 2024. Service is planned to be extended to the Salesforce  Transit Center once the Downtown Rail Extension is completed. Non-stop design speed for this segment is 29 minutes.

The one-way fare between San Francisco and San Jose is expected to cost $22 in 2013 dollars.

The Authority recognizes the value of adding this link as soon as possible to the Initial Operating Segment (IOS), and is exploring ways of obtaining additional funding for it.

FOR FULL INFORMATION, refer to the Authority's documentation: San Francisco to San Jose section

San Jose to Merced / the Diablo Range crossing
The  from San Jose to Merced, crossing the Pacheco Pass, will run at top speed on dedicated HSR tracks (since the current right-of-way south of Tamien is freight-owned). This segment runs through the Chowchilla Wye.

One issue initially debated was the crossing of the Diablo Range via either the Altamont Pass or the Pacheco Pass to link the Bay Area to the Central Valley. On November 15, 2007, Authority staff recommended that the High-Speed Rail follow the Pacheco Pass route because it is more direct and serves both San Jose and San Francisco on the same route, while the Altamont route poses several major engineering obstacles, including crossing San Francisco Bay. Some cities along the Altamont route, such as Pleasanton and Fremont, opposed the Altamont route option, citing concerns over possible property taking and increase in traffic congestion. However, environmental groups, including the Sierra Club, opposed the Pacheco route because the area is less developed and more environmentally sensitive than Altamont.

The Pacheco Pass alignment going through the Grasslands Ecological Area, has been criticized by two environmental groups; The Sierra Club and the Natural Resources Defense Council. A coalition that includes the cities of Menlo Park, Atherton, and Palo Alto has also sued the  Authority to reconsider the Altamont Pass alternative. More than one hundred land owners along the proposed route rejected initial offers by the Authority, and the Authority has taken them to court, seeking to take their land through eminent domain. The possibility of urban sprawl into communities along the route have been raised by farming industry leaders.

On December 19, 2007, the Authority Board of Directors agreed to proceed with the Pacheco Pass option. Pacheco Pass was considered the superior route for long-distance travel between Southern California and the Bay Area, although the Altamont Pass option would serve as a good commuter route. The Authority plans conventional rail upgrades for the Altamont corridor, to complement the high-speed project.

This segment will also cross the Calaveras Fault.

On April 28, 2022 the Authority approved the final route in the San Jose to Merced section. This alignment (Alternative 4) uses the existing UPRR alignment from San Jose to Gilroy. (The section's alternatives are discussed in the San Jose to Merced Project Section, Final Environmental Impact Report/ Environmental Impact Statement, Executive Summary, February 2022.

When tunnel field studies, early engineering, and design work are completed for this section, it will be ready for construction when funding is available.

FOR FULL INFORMATION, refer to the Authority's documentation: San Jose to Merced section

Chowchilla Wye 

The Chowchilla Wye, or Central Valley Wye, is a planned high-speed rail flying wye junction to be located south of Chowchilla in the Central Valley of California. California High-Speed Rail trains will use the structure to switch between the three branches of the Phase I system: westward towards the San Francisco Peninsula, southward towards Bakersfield (and later southern California), and northwards towards Merced  (where passengers may transfer to other rail services until the line is extended to Sacramento). The north–south leg is planned to become operational with the Central Valley Segment opening in 2029, with the full facility coming online when the Peninsula line begins operations.

A study in 2013 identified 14 potential alignments for the Wye, referred to by the closest roads to be paralleled. These were pared down to four options by 2017. In 2019 the California High-Speed Rail Authority selected the final alignment: the State Route 152 / Road 11 option. The board approved that alignment in September 2020.

FOR FULL INFORMATION, refer to the Authority's documentation: Central Valley Wye

(IOS) Merced to Fresno 

The entire  segment from Merced to Fresno in the Central Valley will run on dedicated HSR tracks. This segment also includes the Chowchilla Wye. The southern portion of this segment (north of Madera to Fresno) has received route approval and is undergoing construction.

The Madera station (unlike the other 4 IOS stations) is going to be designed through local means.

FOR FULL INFORMATION, refer to the Authority's documentation: Merced to Fresno section

(IOS) Fresno to Bakersfield
This segment includes stations at Fresno, Kings–Tulare, and Bakersfield, as well as crossings of the Kings River, Cross Creek, and the Kern River.

The  segment in the Central Valley will run on dedicated HSR tracks for the Initial Operating Section in 2029. , the route for this segment has been chosen and approved by the California High-Speed Rail Authority. Final route approval was obtained by the Federal Railroad Administration and the federal Surface Transportation Board in August 2014. The segment is currently under construction. Due to disputes with the cities of Shafter and Bakersfield, the segment under construction currently ends north of Shafter until final routes through Shafter and northern Bakersfield are negotiated with those cities.

FOR FULL INFORMATION, refer to the Authority's documentation: Fresno to Bakersfield section

Bakersfield to Palmdale / the Tehachapi Mountains crossing
The  from Bakersfield to Palmdale crosses the Tehachapi Pass. Non-stop design speed for this segment is 23 minutes.

For comparison, the route over Pacheco Pass begins in Chowchilla (elevation ), crosses the valley floor and climbs to the pass (elevation ), and descends to Gilroy (elevation ). The route over the Tehachapi Pass begins in Bakersfield (elevation ), crosses the valley floor and climbs over steeper mountains to the pass (elevation ), then descends to Palmdale (elevation ).

Community meetings to solicit stakeholder concerns were held around the end of 2015.

In August 2021, the Authority approved the Bakersfield to Palmdale alignment.

FOR FULL INFORMATION, refer to the Authority's documentation: Bakersfield to Palmdale section.

Palmdale to Burbank / the San Gabriel Mountains crossing
This segment will cross the San Gabriel Mountains. Non-stop design speed for this segment is 13 minutes.

On September 2, 2022 the California High-Speed Rail Authority issued the Draft Environmental Impact Report/Environmental Impact Statement for the section. 

FOR FULL INFORMATION, refer to the Authority's documentation: Palmdale to Burbank section

Burbank to Los Angeles
Non-stop design speed for this segment is 13 minutes.

The one-way fare between Burbank and Los Angeles is expected to cost $26 in 2013 dollars.

The Burbank to Los Angeles route was approved in January 2022.

FOR FULL INFORMATION, refer to the Authority's documentation: Burbank to Los Angeles section

Los Angeles to Anaheim
The  from Los Angeles to Anaheim will run on an upgraded Metrolink corridor for Phase 1 Blended in 2033. Non-stop design speed for this segment is 46 minutes.

The one-way fare between Los Angeles and Anaheim is expected to cost $29 in 2013 dollars.

FOR FULL INFORMATION, refer to the Authority's documentation: Los Angeles to Anaheim section

Phase 1 stations & transit system connections
All stations in this table represent proposed HSR service. Station names in italics are optional stations that may not be constructed. In most cases existing stations will be re-purposed for high-speed rail service, with the exception of completely new stations at Merced, Fresno, Kings–Tulare, and Bakersfield.

Note: The Authority considered a mid-peninsula station in Redwood City, Mountain View, or Palo Alto, but it was removed from the business plan in May 2016 due to low ridership projections, although the possibility was raised of adding one in the future.

Phase 2 route details

There has been route planning for Phase 2, but no dates and no financing plans have been made. Proposition 1A requires that Phase 1 be completed before construction is started on Phase 2.

In 2015, the following stations and options were proposed. Existing train stations, if any, are linked. There is often a choice of alignments, some of which may involve the construction of a new station at a different location.

NORTH: Merced to Sacramento
The segment from Merced to Sacramento will be built on dedicated high-speed rail tracks and go to:
 Modesto 
 Stockton 
 Sacramento Valley Station

Proposals for services through a future second Transbay Tube, a San Jose–Oakland line, and a Stockton–Union City line have been studied but are not in the Phase 2 plan adopted by voters statewide.

SOUTH: Los Angeles to San Diego via the Inland Empire
The southernmost segment from Los Angeles to San Diego will be built on dedicated high-speed rail tracks with several routing and stations options. Key stations are identified as:

 Ontario International Airport 
 Escondido near Interstate 15
 San Diego International Airport

Trains may additionally call at:
 El Monte Station
 West Covina
 Pomona (Pomona Metrolink station, or a site on Holt)
 San Bernardino (San Bernardino Transit Center, or a site near Interstate 10)
 Corona (near El Cerrito)
 March Air Reserve Base 
 Murrieta (Interstate 15 and Interstate 215 options)

San Diego is considering how high-speed rail can play a role in their transportation options as Lindbergh Field is expected to reach maximum capacity between 2025 and 2030. A stop has been proposed at the north end of airport in conjunction with a new transit center. Airport consultant suggest that the train could provide an alternative for California destinations such as Los Angeles, San Francisco, Sacramento and Ontario.

Phase 2 stations & transit system connections
Information on preliminary proposed stations will be added later.

References

External links

 California High-Speed Rail Authority
 California State Rail Plan (2022)

California High-Speed Rail
Transportation in San Diego